Roger Laka is a Papua New Guinean rugby league footballer who plays as a  for the Enga Mioks in PNG.

Playing career
Laka was a member of the Papua New Guinea squad for the 2013 World Cup. He scored a try in a warm-up match against Scotland, but did not feature in the tournament itself.

References

Papua New Guinean rugby league players
Enga Mioks players
Papua New Guinea national rugby league team players
Rugby league halfbacks
Papua New Guinea Hunters players